Janaki Rural Municipality may refer:
Janaki Rural Municipality (Kailali District)
Janaki Rural Municipality (Banke District)